TEG Pro Cycling is a South African UCI Continental road cycling team. The team was established in 2018 in preparation for the 2019 season.

Team roster

Major results
2019
Stage 2 Tour of Good Hope, Gustav Basson
Stage 1 Tour de Limpopo, Gustav Basson
Les Challenges de la Marche Verte – GP Oued Eddahab, Jason Oosthuizen
Les Challenges de la Marche Verte – GP Al Massira, Gustav Basson
Overall Challenge International du Sahara Marocain, Gustav Basson
Stage 2, Jason Oosthuizen
Stage 3, Gustav Basson

References

Cycling teams established in 2019
UCI Continental Teams (Africa)
Cycling teams based in South Africa